Viscount  was a Japanese samurai of the late Edo period who served as daimyō of the Mibu Domain in Shimotsuke Province. Succeeded to the family headship in 1870 following his elder brother Torii Tadatomi's retirement due to illness.

He served as Vice Consul to the Kingdom of Hawaii under Taro Ando and was Acting Consul in 1889.

Tadafumi later became a viscount (子爵 shishaku) and a member of the Council of Peers.

References

1847 births
1914 deaths
Daimyo
Kazoku
Japanese politicians
Meiji Restoration
Samurai
Ambassadors of Japan to Hawaii
Members of the Iwakura Mission